Christian Wolff (Naundorf, 1705 – Dahlen, 1773) was a German baroque composer. He studied in Dresden and Leipzig and then was first kapellmeister then rector and organist in Dahlen.

Works, editions and recordings
23 cantatas survive in Mügeln, Nuremberg, and Rossach.
Cantata Mit Fried und Freud ich fahr dahin (on Luther's hymn) Klaus Mertens, Accademia Daniel, dir Shalev Ad-El, 2007.
Cantata Ihr Sorgen lasset mich zufrieden Klaus Mertens, Accademia Daniel, dir Shalev Ad-El.
Cantata Meinens bleibens ist nicht hier Klaus Mertens, Accademia Daniel, dir Shalev Ad-El.

References

German organists
German male organists
German Baroque composers
1705 births
1773 deaths
18th-century classical composers
18th-century keyboardists
German male classical composers
18th-century German composers
18th-century German male musicians